Reasi district is a district of the Indian union territory of Jammu and Kashmir. The Reasi district is located in the Jammu region, bordered by Udhampur district and Ramban district in the east, Jammu district in the south, Rajouri district in the west and by Kulgam district on the north. The Reasi and Rajouri tehsils formed a joint district called the "Reasi district" at the time of princely state's accession to India in 1947. As part of the reorganisation, the two tehsils were separated and Reasi was merged with the Udhampur district. It again became a separate district in 2006.

Reasi is one of the oldest towns of the Jammu and Kashmir State. It was the seat of the erstwhile Bhimgarh State, said to have been established by Raja Bhim Dev sometime in the 8th century. It remained an independent principality till 1822, when Raja Gulab Singh the then Raja of Jammu hill region, under the Sikh empire, consolidated the small states.

Geography
Reasi is located at a distance of 64 km from Jammu and is bounded by Tehsil Gool-Gulabgarh in the north, Tehsil Sunderbani and Kalakote of District Rajouri in the west, Tehsil Udhampur in the east, Tehsils Jammu and Akhnoor of District Jammu on the south. Climatically a major part of this Sub-Division falls in sub-tropical zone and the rest in temperate zone. Summers are generally warm and winters cold with snowfall on the high ridges.

Hindu sites
Major Hindu pilgrimage sites like Vaishno Devi, Shiv Khori, Baba Dhansar and Siyad Baba Waterfall are located in this district.

Access
Being far away from Jammu–Udhampur–Srinagar Highway 1-A and somewhat inaccessible due to the hilly area, economic progress in the mostly hilly region of Reasi has been rather slow. With the commissioning of Salal Hydroelectric Project at Dhyangarh near Reasi, the economic activity of the area has picked up considerably. Construction work of this project was started in 1970 by the National Hydro-Electric Power Corporation (NHPC) and the project was commissioned in 1987 when the first stage of 345 Megawatt power station was completed and balance/the second stage of the project with 345 MW was commissioned in 1995 making the total generation to 690 MW. Power from this project flows to the Northern Grid from where it is distributed to the states of J&K, Punjab, Haryana, Delhi, Himachal Pradesh, Rajasthan, Uttar Pradesh and Chandigarh.

The Jammu–Srinagar–Baramulla Railway line which is under construction passes through the Reasi district. The Railway line up to Katra was inaugurated on 4 July 2014, by the Indian Prime Minister Narendra Modi at Shri Mata Vaishno Devi Katra railway station. From Katra the Railway line traverses to Reasi-Banihal area with stations at Reasi, Salal A–Salal B, Surukot, Barala, Sangaldan, Kohli and Laole. The 1315 meters long railway bridge under construction over river Chenab near Salal with a height of 383.10 meters from the river surface.

Demographics

According to the 2011 census Reasi district has a population of 314,667, roughly equal to the nation of The Bahamas. This gives it a ranking of 570th in India (out of a total of 640). Its population growth rate over the decade 2001-2011 was 27.06%. Reasi has a sex ratio of 890 females for every 1000 males (which varies with religion), and a literacy rate of 59.42%.

Reasi has a population which is nearly evenly split between Muslims and Hindus. Reasi's population stands at 314,667 (2011), of whom 49.67% are Muslims and 48.90% are Hindus.

The main languages spoken in Reasi are Dogri, Gojri, Kashmiri, Pahari, Hindi and Punjabi.

History

Bhimgarh Fort
An historical fort named as Bhimgarh Fort, but generally also known as ‘Reasi Fort’ is located in the town of Reasi on a hillock approximately 150 meters high. As per local lore initially the fort was made of clay which later on was reconstructed with stone masonry and was generally used by the royal family for taking shelter during emergencies. Presently the fort is in the charge of the Department of Archaeology, J&K Government since 1989. Today the fort stands out as one of the important landmarks in the town. During the time this was damaged several times due to its age and natural violence. From time to the government understanding the importance of this fort has tried its best to reconstruct it. It's due to this fact that this fort is still standing in Reasi and it adds shine to the Reasi city.

Inside India
After the accession of the princely state of Jammu and Kashmir to India in 1947, the Rajouri and Reasi tehsils of the former "Reasi district" were separated. Rajouri was merged with the Indian-administered Poonch district, India and Reasi was merged with the Udhampur district.

The people of this hilly area have long agitated for the restoration of the district status for Reasi. The Wazir Commission report, among other recommendations, proposed that it be upgraded to a district. Rishi Kumar Koushal, a prominent leader of the erstwhile Jan Sangh, now Bharatiya Janata Party, led the agitation to restore the district status in the late nineties.

Reasi was upgraded to district level in the year 2007 due to the constant efforts made by the people.

Director and actor Sumit Raina is also a resident of Reasi district.

Mineral Deposits
Lithium deposits have been discovered in Reasi, the first such discovery in India. The Geological Survey of India estimated that there are 5.9 million tonnes of lithium deposits in the Salal-Haimama region in the district.

Administration

Reasi district is one of the 10 districts in the J&K, which came in to existence on 1 April 2007. It is predominantly a hill district, which enjoys variable climatic conditions, ranging from sub-tropical to the semi-temperate. The district can be divided into 'hilly' and 'low-lying hilly' regions.

The district is divided into nine tehsils and 22 niabats. There are 12 development blocks with 147 panchayat halquas.

Tehsils
 Reasi
 Pouni
 Katra
 Bhomag
 Arnas
 Throo
 Chassana
 Thakrakote
 Mahore

Blocks
 Reasi
 Gulabgarh
 Pouni
 Katra
 Bhomag
 Arnas
 Thuroo
 Chassana
 Thakrakote
 Mahore
 Panthal
 Jij

Villages
 

 Domaldi

Places of interest
GULAB GARH
Dhagantop
RAMA KUNDA
Bhimgarh Fort
Shivkhori
Vaishno Devi Temple
Kalika Temple
Baba Dhansar
Dhyangarh
Baba Bidda
Siarh Baba
Sula Park
Dhera Baba
Thanpal
Dewel Marg
Kote Gali
Ans River

References

http://reasi.gov.in/about.html

External links

 Official Website of J&K Govt
 Official Website of Reasi
 Google Maps Reasi

 
Districts of Jammu and Kashmir